Anthony Clement "Nuts" McAuliffe (July 2, 1898 – August 10, 1975) was a senior United States Army officer who earned fame as the acting commander of the 101st Airborne Division defending Bastogne, Belgium, during the Battle of the Bulge in World War II. He is celebrated for his one-word reply to a German surrender ultimatum: "Nuts!"

After the battle, McAuliffe was promoted and given command of the 103rd Infantry Division, which he led from January 1945 to July 1945. In the post-war era, he was commander of United States Army Europe.

Early life and military career

McAuliffe was born in Washington, D.C., on July 2, 1898. He attended West Virginia University from 1916 to 1917. He was a member of the West Virginia Beta chapter of Sigma Phi Epsilon Fraternity during his time at West Virginia University. He enrolled at West Point in 1917. McAuliffe was part of an accelerated program and graduated shortly after the end of World War I, in November 1918.

During this time, he visited Europe for a short time and toured several battlefields. Assigned to field artillery, he graduated from the Artillery School in 1920. For the next 16 years, McAuliffe carried out typical peacetime assignments. By 1935, he had been promoted to the rank of Captain. Later, he was chosen to attend the United States Army Command and General Staff College at Fort Leavenworth. In June 1940, McAuliffe graduated from the United States Army War College. Just before the Japanese attack on Pearl Harbor in December 1941, he was promoted again, temporarily becoming a lieutenant colonel with the Supply Division of the War Department General Staff. While in this position, McAuliffe supervised the development of such new technology as the bazooka and the jeep.

World War II

Brigadier General McAuliffe commanded the division artillery of the 101st Airborne Division when he parachuted into Normandy on D-Day. He also landed by glider in the Netherlands during Operation Market Garden. 

In December 1944, the German army launched the surprise attack that became the Battle of the Bulge. Major General Maxwell D. Taylor, commander of the 101st Airborne Division, was attending a staff conference in the United States at the time.  During Taylor's absence, McAuliffe commanded the 101st and its attached troops. At Bastogne, the 101st was besieged by a far larger force of Germans under the command of General Heinrich Freiherr von Lüttwitz.

"NUTS!"
On December 22, 1944, von Lüttwitz dispatched a party, consisting of a major, a lieutenant, and two enlisted men under a flag of truce to deliver an ultimatum.  Entering the American lines southeast of Bastogne (occupied by Company F, 2nd Battalion, 327th Glider Infantry), the German party delivered the following to Gen. McAuliffe:

According to those present when McAuliffe received the German message, he read it, crumpled it into a ball, threw it in a wastepaper basket, and muttered, "Aw, nuts". The officers in McAuliffe's command post were trying to find suitable language for an official reply when Lt. Col. Harry Kinnard suggested that McAuliffe's first response summed up the situation pretty well, and the others agreed. The official reply was typed and delivered by Colonel Joseph Harper, commanding the 327th Glider Infantry, to the German delegation. It was as follows:

The German major appeared confused and asked Harper what the message meant. Harper said, "In plain English? Go to hell." The choice of "Nuts!" rather than something earthier was typical for McAuliffe. Captain Vincent Vicari, his personal aide at the time, recalled that "General Mac was the only general I ever knew who did not use profane language. 'Nuts' was part of his normal vocabulary."

The artillery fire did not materialize, although several infantry and tank assaults were directed at the positions of the 327th Glider Infantry. In addition, the German Luftwaffe attacked the town, bombing it nightly. The 101st held off the Germans until the 4th Armored Division arrived on December 26 to provide reinforcement.

Post-Bastogne

For his actions at Bastogne, McAuliffe was awarded the Distinguished Service Cross by General Patton on December 30, 1944 with official orders processed on January 14, 1945. He later received the Army Distinguished Service Medal twice, the Silver Star and the Legion of Merit.

Immediately after Bastogne, McAuliffe was promoted to Major General and given command of the 103rd Infantry Division on January 15, 1945, his first divisional command assignment, which he retained until July 1945. Under McAuliffe, the 103rd reached the Rhine Valley, March 23, and engaged in mopping up operations in the plain west of the Rhine River. In April 1945, the division was assigned to occupational duties until April 20, when it resumed the offensive, pursuing a fleeing enemy through Stuttgart and taking Münsingen on April 24. On April 27, elements of the division entered Landsberg, where Kaufering concentration camp, a subcamp of Dachau, was liberated.  The 103rd crossed the Danube River near Ulm on April 26. On May 3, 1945, the 103rd captured Innsbruck, Austria, with little to no fighting. It then seized the Brenner Pass and met the 88th Infantry Division of the U.S. Fifth Army at Vipiteno, Italy, thereby joining the Italian and Western European fronts.

Post-war
Following the war, McAuliffe held many positions, including Chief Chemical Officer of the Army Chemical Corps, and G-1, Head of Army Personnel. He returned to Europe as Commander of the Seventh Army in 1953, and Commander-in-Chief of the United States Army Europe in 1955. He was promoted to four-star general in 1955.

While still in the service, McAuliffe attended the premiere of Battleground in Washington D.C. on November 9, 1949. The film did not depict McAuliffe directly, but did show a scene of the Germans presenting their surrender demands and their confusion on receiving McAuliffe's reply.

Retirement
In 1956, McAuliffe retired from the army. He worked for American Cyanamid Corporation from 1956 to 1963 as vice president for personnel. He began a program to teach employees to maintain contact with local politicians. The company subsequently required all branch managers to at least introduce themselves to local politicians.  McAuliffe also served as chairman of the New York State Civil Defense Commission from 1960 to 1963.

After his retirement from American Cyanamid in 1963, McAuliffe resided in Chevy Chase, Maryland, until his death on August 10, 1975, age 77. He is buried in Arlington National Cemetery.

Dates of rank

Awards and decorations
McAuliffe's decorations include the following:

Badges

Decorations

Unit award

Service medals

Foreign awards

Memorials

The central square of Bastogne, Belgium, is named Place Général McAuliffe. A Sherman tank, pierced by a German 88 mm shell, stands in one corner.

A southern extension of Route 33 in eastern Northampton County, Pennsylvania, completed in 2002, was named the Gen. Anthony Clement McAuliffe 101st Airborne Memorial Highway.

The new headquarters building for the 101st Airborne Division, which opened in 2009 at Fort Campbell, Kentucky, is named McAuliffe Hall.

A room at the Thayer Hotel at West Point has been dedicated to General McAuliffe.

References

External links

 
 "NUTS!" Revisited
Generals of World War II

|-

|-

|-

1898 births
1975 deaths
United States Army Field Artillery Branch personnel
Burials at Arlington National Cemetery
People from Chevy Chase, Maryland
Military personnel from Washington, D.C.
Recipients of the Distinguished Service Cross (United States)
Recipients of the Distinguished Service Medal (US Army)
Recipients of the Legion of Merit
Recipients of the Silver Star
United States Army generals
United States Military Academy alumni
West Virginia University alumni
Military personnel from Maryland
United States Army generals of World War II